Lake Damon is a natural circular lake in northwest Highlands County, Florida. The lake is bounded on the south by the city limits of the city of Avon Park, Florida, on the west by a railroad and US 27 and on the north by a housing development and the River Greens Golf Course. About a block to the east is Lake Pythias.

Lake Damon is used for fishing and boating.  There is a public boat ramp located on the west side of the lake, off a road leading to US 27.

References

Damon
Damon